Events in the year 1971 in Brazil.

Incumbents

Federal government
 President: General Emílio Garrastazu Médici  
 Vice President: General Augusto Rademaker

Governors 
 Acre: vacant
 Alagoas: Antônio Simeão de Lamenha Filho (until 15 March); Afrânio Lages (from 15 March)
 Amazonas: Danilo Duarte de Matos Areosa (until 15 March); João Walter de Andrade (from 15 March)
 Bahia: Luís Viana Filho (until 15 March); Antônio Carlos Magalhães (from 15 March)
 Ceará: Plácido Castelo (until 25 March); César Cals (from 25 March)
 Espírito Santo: Cristiano Dias Lopes Filho (until 15 March); Artur Carlos Gerhardt Santos (from 15 March)
 Goiás: Otávio Lage (until 15 March); Leonino Caiado (from 15 March)
 Guanabara: Antonio de Pádua Chagas Freitas
 Maranhão: Antônio Jorge Dino (until 15 March); Pedro Neiva de Santana (from 15 March)
 Mato Grosso: Pedro Pedrossian then José Fragelli 
 Minas Gerais: Israel Pinheiro da Silva (until 15 March); Rondon Pacheco (from 15 March)
 Pará: Alacid Nunes (until 15 March); Fernando Guilhon (from 15 March)
 Paraíba: João Agripino Maia (until 15 March); Ernâni Sátiro (from 15 March)
 Paraná: Haroldo Leon Peres then Pedro Viriato Parigot de Sousa 
 Pernambuco: Nilo Coelho (until 15 March); Eraldo Gueiros (from 15 March)
 Piauí: João Clímaco d'Almeida (until 15 March); Alberto Silva (from 15 March)
 Rio de Janeiro: Geremias de Mattos Fontes then Raimundo Padilha
 Rio Grande do Norte: Walfredo Gurgel Dantas (until 15 March); Jose Pereira de Araújo Cortez (from 15 March)
 Rio Grande do Sul: Walter Peracchi Barcelos (until 15 March); Euclides Triches (from 15 March)
 Santa Catarina: Ivo Silveira (until 15 March); Colombo Salles (from 15 March)
 São Paulo: Roberto Costa de Abreu Sodré (until 15 March); Laudo Natel (from 15 March)
 Sergipe: João de Andrade Garcez (until 15 March); Paulo Barreto de Menezes (from 15 March)

Vice governors
 Acre: Alberto Barbosa da Costa (from 15 March)
 Alagoas: Manoel Sampaio Luz (until 15 March); José de Medeiros Tavares (from 15 March)
 Amazonas: Deoclides de Carvalho Leal (from 15 March)
 Bahia: Jutahy Magalhães (until 15 March); Menandro Minahim (from 15 March)
 Ceará: Humberto Ellery (until 15 March); Francisco Humberto Bezerra (from 15 March)
 Espírito Santo: Isaac Lopes Rubim (until 15 March); Henrique Pretti (from 15 March)
 Goiás: Osires Teixeira (until 31 January); Ursulino Tavares Leão (from 15 March)
 Maranhão: Alexandre Sá Colares Moreira (from 15 March)
 Mato Grosso: Lenine de Campos Póvoas (until 15 March); José Monteiro de Figueiredo (from 15 March)
 Minas Gerais: Pio Soares Canedo (until 15 March); Celso Porfírio de Araújo Machado (from 15 March)
 Pará: João Renato Franco (until 15 March); Newton Burlamaqui Barreira (from 15 March)
 Paraíba: Antônio Juarez Farias (until 15 March); Clóvis Bezerra Cavalcanti (from 15 March)
 Paraná: Plínio Franco Ferreira da Costa (until 15 March); Pedro Viriato Parigot de Souza (from 15 March)
 Pernambuco: Salviano Machado Filho (until 15 March); José Antônio Barreto Guimarães (from 15 March)
 Piauí: Sebastião Rocha Leal (from 15 March) 
 Rio de Janeiro: Heli Ribeiro Gomes (until 15 March); Teotônio Araújo (from 15 March)
 Rio Grande do Norte: Clóvis Motta (until 15 March); Tertius Rebelo (from 15 March)
 Rio Grande do Sul: Edmar Fetter (from 15 March)
 Santa Catarina: Jorge Bornhausen (until 15 March); Atílio Francisco Xavier Fontana (from 15 March)
 São Paulo: Hilário Torloni (until 15 March); Antonio José Rodrigues Filho (from 15 March) 
 Sergipe: Manoel Paulo Vasconcelos (until 15 March); Adalberto Moura (from 15 March)

Events 
14 January – Seventy Brazilian political prisoners are released in Santiago, Chile.
16 January – Giovanni Enrico Bucher, the Swiss ambassador to Brazil, is released by the Ação Libertadora Nacional, 40 days after his kidnapping.
20 November – 29 people die when a section of the Elevado Engenheiro Freyssinet, a bridge under construction, falls on traffic at an intersection in Rio de Janeiro.

Births
 24 May – Vivianne Pasmanter, actress

Deaths

References

See also 
1971 in Brazilian football
1971 in Brazilian television

 
1970s in Brazil
Years of the 20th century in Brazil
Brazil
Brazil